The 2006 Canadian Grand Prix (officially the Formula 1 Grand Prix du Canada 2006) was a Formula One motor race held on 25 June 2006 at the Circuit Gilles Villeneuve in Montreal, Quebec, Canada. The 70-lap race was the ninth round of the 2006 Formula One season.

Friday drivers
The bottom 6 teams in the 2005 Constructors' Championship and Super Aguri were entitled to run a third car in free practice on Friday. These drivers drove on Friday but did not compete in qualifying or the race.

Race
Polesitter Fernando Alonso took his sixth win of the season and increased his championship lead over Michael Schumacher, who finished second after passing Kimi Räikkönen with two laps remaining when the Finn ran wide. Räikkönen subsequently finished in third position, completing the podium for the McLaren team. Alonso had now taken six wins and three second places from the first nine races.

There were problems at the start of the race when the two Midland cars collided at the tight hairpin on Lap 1, before Juan Pablo Montoya and Nico Rosberg collided on Lap 2 (which necessitated bringing out the safety car). Rosberg retired, whilst Montoya continued until he collided with a wall later in the race. Schumacher was stuck behind Jarno Trulli for a large proportion of the race before finally managing to overtake him, although Alonso had gained a considerable lead over him by this point.

With just a handful of laps left the safety car was out for a second time, as home-town hero Jacques Villeneuve crashed into the wall due to brake failure. This was Villeneuve's last F1 start at the circuit named after his father. Räikkönen, who was second in the snake of cars behind the safety car, was unable to take advantage of the closed gap to Alonso due backmarkers in front of him. He eventually lost the position to Schumacher.

Classification

Qualifying

Notes
  – David Coulthard received a 10 place grid penalty because of an engine change after qualifying.

Race

Championship standings after the race

Drivers' Championship standings

Constructors' Championship standings

 Note: Only the top five positions are included for both sets of standings.

References

External links

 Detailed Canadian Grand Prix results

Canadian Grand Prix
Canadian Grand Prix
Grand Prix
2000s in Montreal
2006 in Quebec
Grand Prix